Maru Malarchi, also spelled as Marumalarchi, is a 1998 Indian Tamil-language drama film directed by Bharathi and produced by Henry. The film stars Mammootty, Devayani, Ranjith and Mansoor Ali Khan, with Manorama, Kalabhavan Mani, R. Sundarrajan, Major Sundararajan, Vivek and Pandu playing supporting roles. It was released on 14 January 1998 and become a huge success. The film was remade in Telugu as Suryudu, in Kannada as Soorappa and in Hindi as Phool Aur Aag.

Plot

Rasu Padayachi (Mammootty) is the chief of his village Gunavasal, he is a kind-hearted person who is highly respected by the villagers, he is so respected that the people even erect his statue in the village. Rasu Padayachi has dedicated his life for the welfare of the village people. When the Muslim peoples of the surrounding villages wanted to buy one of his lands to build a Mosque there, Rasu Padayachi refuses their money and he gives them his land for free.

In the village Sundarapuram, Manimaran (Ranjith) is a respected village chief who lives with his parents (M. N. Rajam and K. K. Soundar). Manimaran and his cousin Mannaru (Mansoor Ali Khan) are known for being short-tempered persons.

Rasu Padayachi is invited to open a rice shop in a remote village. After the ceremony, Rasu Padayachi and his car driver Velu are on their way home to their village Gunavasal. Rasu Padayachi then stops the car in order to buy some fruits in Sundarapuram's market. In his village, nobody would not take money for his shopping which makes him uncomfortable so he prefers to do shopping in surrounding villages. At the market, Rasu Padayachi pulls the village belle Jayanthi's (Devayani) hand to save her from an approaching snake. Unfortunately, only Velu and Rasu Padayachi seem to have noticed the snake. Jayanthi makes a big fuss of the event by assuming Rasu Padayachi to be a rogue. Manimaran and Mannaru beat him up in public without taking notice of his defence.

The land broker and family friend Shanmugasundaram (Shanmugasundaram) sees the injured Rasu Padayachi in that village, Rasu Padayachi says it was just a misunderstanding. The angry Shanmugasundaram goes to that market and he makes the villagers understand that they have done a huge mistake, he warns that this incident may lead to serious consequences if Gunavasal's villagers come to know the truth. Manimaran and Mannaru realize their mistake and regret the incident. In the meantime, Rasu Padayachi warns his driver not to talk about the humiliating incident to anyone and pretends the injuries were due to an accident.

Once back home, the man of honour Rasu Padayachi lies to the villagers that he had a car accident. Velu, who was frustrated and angry of the incident, finally disclose the matter to the villagers that same night. Meanwhile, as per his father's advice, Manimaran goes on horseback to Gunavasal on the very night to seek an apology. When he discloses the incident to Rasu Padayachi's mother, she beats him but Rasu Padayachi stops her. Manimaran falls at Rasu Padayachi's feet and begs for an apology, the kind Rasu Padayachi forgives him and Manimaran returns to his village.

Gunavasal's villagers get angry after knowing about the incident and they all go to Sundarapuram with Aruvals (Billhooks) without warning Rasu Padayachi. They create a mess in Sundarapuram, and set fire on their houses. The riot causes the death of many villagers including Manimaran's parents and Jayanthi's mother.

The next morning, Manimaran finally comes to his village, he notes the damage and deaths. The district collector and the police arrive at Rasu Padayachi's village to tell him to be safe, and that they will now handle the issue between the two villages. Rasu Padayachi becomes furious with his driver and his village people when he learns about the previous night's riot. Manimaran feels betrayed by Rasu Padayachi and he sees the destruction of Sundarapuram as Rasu Padayachi's cunning plan, an angry Manimaran then destroys Rasu Padayachi's statue in front of Gunavasal's villagers.

The trio Jayanthi, Manimaran and Mannaru vow to take revenge on Rasu Padayachi in a similarly cunning fashion. Later, Rasu Padayachi wants to help financially the victims but they refuse his money. Rasu Padayachi offers to marry Jayanthi, as she has nobody left in her life to live with but she sees this as an opportunity to destroy Rasu Padayachi. Both Manimaran and Mannaru are also convinced so.

After the marriage, Jayanthi discovers Rasu Padayachi's true nature: a golden-hearted man and she becomes a good wife. On the other hand, Manimaran and Mannaru still seek revenge on Rasu Padayachi. What transpires next forms the rest of the story.

Cast

Mammootty as Rasu Padayachi
Devayani as Jayanthi
Ranjith as Manimaran
Mansoor Ali Khan as Mannaru
Kalabhavan Mani as Velu
Manorama as Rasu Padayachi's mother
R. Sundarrajan
Major Sundararajan
Jyothi Lakshmi
Vivek as Nagaraj
Pandu as Azhagu
Vasu Vikram as Madhavarayan
Bala Singh as Kalingarayan
Vaiyapuri as Palli
M. N. Rajam as Manimaran's mother
S. N. Lakshmi
Ramyasri
Shakeela
Shanmugasundaram as land broker
K. K. Soundar as Manimaran's father
Pasi Narayanan
Bayilvan Ranganathan as Kasinathan
Anwar Ali Khan
Tirupur Ramasamy
A. K. Veerasamy as Mariappan
John Babu in a guest appearance
Bharathi as Snake charmer
Appukutty as Tea seller (uncredited role)
Soori as Audience member (uncredited role)

Production
The producers of the film initially approached Vijayakanth to portray the lead role, but his busy schedules meant that Mammootty was selected. A village set costing close to 25 lakhs was built near Tiruvannamalai for the film. Moreover, a huge mosque set was also built for the climax of the film.

Awards
The film has won the following awards since its release :

Tamil Nadu State Film Awards 1998 

Best Film Award (2nd Place)
Best Villain — Ranjith
Best Dialogue Writer — Bharathi

Soundtrack

The film score and the soundtrack were composed by S. A. Rajkumar. The soundtrack, released in 1998, features 7 tracks with lyrics written by Vaali and V.C. Vijayshankar.

Reception
The Times of India wrote "The strength of Marumalarchi lies in its story which improves upon the cliche of the virtuous village patriarch. The story-telling is straight forward and wavers only occasionally." The film was the best performer at the box office from six Tamil film released on 14 January 1998. Screen India writes, "Mammootty’s sterling performance as Rasapadiyachi, the zamindar, and his excellent rendering of the native dialect aided by a gripping screenplay, have made the film a superhit with the masses." S. K. Suresh Babu of Indolink wrote, "Two things stand out in the film.  The dialogues and Mammooty, who excels in the role with his casual acting and casual dialogue delivery.  Given the situations and the dialogue, any other hero, such as Vijayakanth or Prabhu, would have overacted. Nice to see Mansoor and Ranjith show a more human side to villainy." Concluding he called it a refreshing film.

Possible sequel 
The director of the film announced a sequel to the project in 2020.

References

External links
 

1998 films
Tamil films remade in other languages
1990s Tamil-language films
Indian drama films
Films scored by S. A. Rajkumar
1998 directorial debut films